Miguel Santa Lucía Ojopi Sosa (born 14 December 1967), often referred to as Yaco, is a Bolivian businessman and politician who served as a party-list member of the Chamber of Deputies from Pando from 2015 to 2020. A member of the Revolutionary Nationalist Movement, Ojopi entered politics as the party's departmental leader for Pando. In 2006, he was elected to serve as a party-list member of the Constituent Assembly for Pando from 2006 to 2007. After unsuccessfully contesting the Cobija mayoralty in 2010, Ojopi was elected to represent Pando in the Chamber of Deputies. As with other Revolutionary Nationalist Movement deputies elected as part of the Democratic Unity alliance, Ojopi split with the coalition shortly after assuming office, composing part of a quaternary opposition caucus in the lower chamber for the duration of his term.

Early life and career 
Miguel Ojopi was born on 14 December 1967 in Cobija, Pando. He is a member of the Baure tribe, a small grouping of indigenous peoples native to the eastern Beni Department. Despite his primarily Amerindian roots, Ojopi considers himself, first and foremost, ethnically mestizo, maintaining that he and his parents had "modernized" themselves by adopting urban lifestyles and hence no longer pertained to antiquated tribal cultures. Ojopi attended the Technical University of Beni in Trinidad, during which time he became active in student leadership. Upon his return to Cobija, he dedicated himself to commerce, specializing in the almond industry, one of the lowland region's primary agribusiness sectors.

Early political career 
Ojopi entered the political field as a member of the Revolutionary Nationalist Movement (MNR), serving as the party's departmental leader for Pando. In contrast to other parties like Solidarity Civic Unity—with which Ojopi's brother, José Carlos, unsuccessfully contested Pando's circumscription 68 in 1997—the MNR had enjoyed a commanding electoral presence in the Pando Department since the country's transition to democracy. This dominance, however, was drastically reduced following the collapse of Gonzalo Sánchez de Lozada's government in 2003, which left the party permanently debilitated nationwide. It was in this context, and hot off the trail of a poor general election result the year prior, that the MNR contested the 2006 Constituent Assembly elections, with Ojopi topping its electoral list in the Pando Department. The party exited the race in a distant fourth place, a margin that, while small, still permitted it one constituent in the incoming assembly.

As a constituent, Ojopi pushed for the codification of departmental autonomy for Pando and the other eight departments, a primary policy priority articulated by most conservative currents opposed to the ruling Movement for Socialism (MAS-IPSP). Additionally, Ojopi was one of several opposition constituents who vocalized their rejection of the Constituent Assembly as a stage for "folkloric" representation. For figures like Ojopi, the assembly was "serious business", where slogans of constitutional representation for indigenous peoples, the peasantry, and "those carrying feathers, ponchos, and arrows" had no place. Even after the passage of the 2009 Constitution, Ojopi continued to qualify legislation such as that that required all public officials to speak two State recognized languages as "absurd": "Spanish is the language in which we all understand each other... everyone speaks Spanish... I cannot understand... those who speak Aymara and Quechua... if I speak Cavineño, who is going to understand me?".

Upon the conclusion of his term in the Constituent Assembly, Ojopi continued to operate in Pando politics. In 2010, he sought the Cobija mayoralty as part of an alliance between the MNR and Popular Consensus (CP). Although CP saw a wide array of victories in nine of Pando's fifteen municipalities, Ojopi narrowly failed to win the capital, being defeated by Ana Lucía Reis, a former MNR partisan who had switched allegiances to the MAS.

Chamber of Deputies

Election 

Four years after his 2010 mayoral loss, Ojopi returned to the national scene, seeking a seat in the Chamber of Deputies on behalf of Democratic Unity (UD). The alliance was made up of the National Unity Front, the Social Democratic Movement, and regional factions of the MNR that, since 2003, had maintained a still-competitive partisan base in the lowland departments. He topped the alliance's party list in the department, winning the seat.

Tenure 
No less than fifteen days after assuming office, Ojopi and the entire group of MNR deputies elected as part of UD broke away from the alliance, establishing their own quaternary caucus within the Chamber of Deputies. Spearheaded by Erik Morón, this caucus operated independently of the other opposition parties for the duration of its term, including presenting its own candidates for committees and commissions. With the support of the MAS, nearly all of its members were elected to leadership roles in parliamentary committees, including Ojopi, who headed the Community Economics Committee. The emergence of the MNR as a separate parliamentary bloc further fractured the already weak opposition, relegating many other deputies to minor roles in legislative administration. Although the MNR ran its own slate of candidates for the 2019 general election, Ojopi was not nominated for a second term. In fact, in the final stretch of the campaign, Ojopi aligned himself with a faction of the MNR in Pando that broke away from the party's presidential candidate Virginio Lema and endorsed the candidacy of Carlos Mesa, whom they viewed as better positioned to defeat the MAS.

Commission assignments 
 Plural Economy, Production, and Industry Commission
 Community Economics and Social Cooperatives Committee (Secretary; –)
 Agriculture and Animal Husbandry Committee (–)
 Planning, Economic Policy, and Finance Commission
 Financial, Monetary, and Insurance Policy Committee (Secretary; –, –)
 Rural Native Indigenous Peoples and Nations, Cultures, and Interculturality Commission
 Coca Leaf Committee (–)

Electoral history

References

Notes

Footnotes

Bibliography

External links 
 Deputies profile Vice Presidency .
 Deputies profile Chamber of Deputies . Archived from the original on 8 August 2020.

1967 births
Living people
20th-century Bolivian businesspeople
21st-century Bolivian businesspeople
21st-century Bolivian politicians
Bolivian politicians of indigenous peoples descent
Members of the Bolivian Constituent Assembly
Members of the Bolivian Chamber of Deputies from Pando
People from Cobija
Revolutionary Nationalist Movement politicians